The square planar molecular geometry in chemistry describes the stereochemistry (spatial arrangement of atoms) that is adopted by certain chemical compounds. As the name suggests, molecules of this geometry have their atoms positioned at the corners.

Examples
Numerous compounds adopt this geometry, examples being especially numerous for transition metal complexes. The noble gas compound XeF4 adopts this structure as predicted by VSEPR theory. The geometry is prevalent for transition metal complexes with d8 configuration, which includes Rh(I), Ir(I), Pd(II), Pt(II), and Au(III). Notable examples include the anticancer drugs cisplatin [PtCl2(NH3)2] and carboplatin. Many homogeneous catalysts are square planar in their resting state, such as Wilkinson's catalyst and Crabtree's catalyst. Other examples include Vaska's complex and Zeise's salt. Certain ligands (such as porphyrins) stabilize this geometry.

Splitting of d-orbitals 

A general d-orbital splitting diagram for square planar (D4h) transition metal complexes can be derived from the general octahedral (Oh) splitting diagram, in which the dz2 and the dx2−y2 orbitals are degenerate and higher in energy than the degenerate set of dxy, dxz and dyz orbitals. When the two axial ligands are removed to generate a square planar geometry, the dz2 orbital is driven lower in energy as electron-electron repulsion with ligands on the z-axis is no longer present. However, for purely σ-donating ligands the dz2 orbital is still higher in energy than the dxy, dxz and dyz orbitals because of the torus shaped lobe of the dz2 orbital. It bears electron density on the x- and y-axes and therefore interacts with the filled ligand orbitals. The dxy, dxz and dyz orbitals are generally presented as degenerate but they have to split into two different energy levels with respect to the irreducible representations of the point group D4h. Their relative ordering depends on the nature of the particular complex. Furthermore, the splitting of d-orbitals is perturbed by π-donating ligands in contrast to octahedral complexes. In the square planar case strongly π-donating ligands can cause the dxz and dyz orbitals to be higher in energy than the dz2 orbital, whereas in the octahedral case π-donating ligands only affect the magnitude of the d-orbital splitting and the relative ordering of the orbitals is conserved.

See also 
AXE method
Molecular geometry

References

External links
 3D Chem – Chemistry, Structures, and 3D Molecules
 IUMSC – Indiana University Molecular Structure Center
 Interactive molecular examples for point groups
  – Coordination numbers and complex ions

Stereochemistry
Molecular geometry